Filming Women in the Third Reich is a 2000 book written by Jo Fox and Angela Gaffney.

References

2000 non-fiction books
Women in Nazi Germany